This is a list of butterflies and moths—species of the order Lepidoptera—that have been observed in the U.S. state of Michigan.

Butterflies

Papilionidae 

 Eastern tiger swallowtail, Papilio glaucus
 Canadian tiger swallowtail, Papilio canadensis
 Spicebush swallowtail, Papilio troilus
 Black swallowtail, Papilio polyxenes
 Giant swallowtail, Papilio cresphontes
 Zebra swallowtail, Eurytides marcellus
 Pipevine swallowtail, Battus philenor

Pieridae 
 Cabbage white, Pieris rapae
 Mustard white, Pieris oleracea
 West Virginia white, Pieris virginiensis
 Checkered white, Pontia protodice 
 Olympia marble, Euchloe olympia 
 Clouded sulphur, Colias philodice 
 Orange sulphur, Colias eurytheme
 Pink-edged sulphur, Colias interior
 Little yellow, Eurema lisa

Lycaenidae

Lycaenini
 American copper, Lycaena phlaeas
 Dorcas copper, Lycaena dorcas
 Purplish copper, Lycaena helloides
 Bog copper, Lycaena epixanthe
 Bronze copper, Lycaena hyllus
 Harvester, Feniseca tarquinius

Theclini & Eumaeini
 Gray hairstreak, Strymon melinus
 White M hairstreak, Parrhasius m-album
 Banded hairstreak, Satyrium calanus
 Hickory hairstreak, Satyrium caryaevorus
 Edward's hairstreak, Satyrium edwardsii
 Striped hairstreak, Satyrium liparops
 Northern oak hairstreak, Satyrium favonius ontario
 Acadian hairstreak, Satyrium acadica
 Coral hairstreak, Satyrium titus
 Brown elfin, Callophrys augustinus
 Henry's elfin, Callophrys henrici
 Frosted elfin, Callophrys irus
 Hoary elfin, Callophrys polios
 Eastern pine elfin, Callophrys niphon
 Western pine elfin, Callophrys eryphon
 Early hairstreak, Erora laeta

Polyommatini
 Eastern tailed-blue, Cupido comyntas
 Silvery blue, Glaucopsyche lygdamus
 Spring azure, Celastrina ladon
 Summer azure, Celastrina neglecta
 Greenish blue, Icaricia saepiolus
 Melissa blue, Plebejus melissa
 Karner blue, Plebejus melissa samuelis
 Anna's blue, Plebejus anna

Riodinidae
 Swamp metalmark, Calephelis muticum

Nymphalidae

Heliconiinae
 Variegated fritillary, Euptoieta claudia
 Great spangled fritillary, Speyeria cybele
 Atlantis fritillary, Speyeria atlantis 
 Aphrodite fritillary, Speyeria aphrodite
 Meadow fritillary, Boloria bellona
 Frigga fritillary, Boloria frigga
 Silver-bordered fritillary, Boloria selene
 Bog fritillary, Boloria eunomia
 Freija fritillary, Boloria freija

Nymphalinae
 Pearl crescent, Phyciodes tharos
 Northern crescent, Phyciodes cocyta
 Tawny crescent, Phyciodes batesii
 Gorgone checkerspot, Chlosyne gorgone
 Silvery checkerspot, Chlosyne nycteis
 Harris's checkerspot, Chlosyne harrisii
 Baltimore checkerspot, Euphydryas phaeton
 Question mark, Polygonia interrogationis
 Eastern comma, Polygonia comma
 Satyr comma, Polygonia satyrus
 Green comma, Polygonia faunus
 Hoary comma, Polygonia gracilis
 Gray comma, Polygonia progne
 Compton tortoiseshell, Nymphalis vaualbum
 Mourning cloak, Nymphalis antiopa
 Milbert's tortoiseshell, Aglais milberti
 Red admiral, Vanessa atalanta
 American lady, Vanessa virginiensis
 Painted lady, Vanessa cardui
 Common buckeye, Junonia coenia
 White admiral, Limenitis arthemis
 Red-spotted purple, Limenitis arthemis
 Viceroy, Limenitis archippus
 Hackberry emperor, asterocampa celtis
 Tawny emperor, asterocampa clyton
 American snout, Libytheana carinenta
 Monarch, Danaus plexippus

Satyrinae
 Little wood satyr, Megisto cymela
 Mitchell's satyr, Neonympha mitchellii
 Common wood nymph, Cercyonis pegala
 Eyed brown, Satyrodes eurydice
 Appalachian brown, Satyrodes appalachia
 Northern pearly-eye, Enodia anthedon
 Common ringlet, Coenonympha tullia
 Red-disked alpine, Erebia discoidalis
 Chryxus Arctic, Oeneis chryxus
 Jutta Arctic, Oeneis jutta

Hesperiidae

Pyrginae & Pyrrhopyginae
 Silver-spotted skipper, Epargyreus clarus
 Hoary Edge, Achalarus lyciades
 Southern cloudywing, Thorybes bathyllus
 Northern cloudywing, Thorybes pylades
 Juvenal's duskywing, Erynnis juvenalis
 Horace's duskywing, Erynnis horatius
 Dreamy duskywing, Erynnis icelus
 Sleepy duskywing, Erynnis brizo
 Persius duskywing, Erynnis persius
 Wild indigo duskywing, Erynnis baptisiae
 Columbine duskywing, Erynnis lucilius
 Mottled duskywing, Erynnis martialis
 Common checkered-skipper, Pyrgus communis
 Grizzled skipper, Pyrgus centaureae
 Common sootywing, Pholisora catullus

Heteropterinae & Hesperiinae
 Arctic skipper, Carterocephalus palaemon
 European skipper, Thymelicus lineola
 Least skipper, Ancyloxypha numitor
 Poweshiek skipperling, Oarisma poweshiek
 Common branded skipper, Hesperia comma
 Cobweb skipper, Hesperia metea
 Leonard's skipper, Hesperia leonardus
 Indian skipper, Hesperia sassacus
 Ottoe skipper, Hesperia ottoe
 Long dash, Polites mystic
 Peck's skipper, Polites peckius
 Tawny-edged skipper, Polites themistocles
 Crossline skipper, Polites origenes
 Black dash, Euphyes conspicua
 Northern broken-dash, Wallengrenia egeremet
 Little glassywing, Pompeius verna
 Dun skipper, Euphyes vestris
 Hobomok skipper, Poanes hobomok
 Zabulon skipper, Poanes zabulon
 Mulberry wing, Poanes massasoit
 Broad-winged skipper, Poanes viator
 Two-spotted skipper, Euphyes bimacula
 Dion skipper, Euphyes dion
 Duke's skipper, Euphyes dukesi
 Delaware skipper, Anatrytone logan
 Dusted skipper, Atrytonopsis hianna
 Common roadside skipper, Amblyscirtes vialis
 Pepper-and-salt skipper, Amblyscirtes hegon

Moths

Arctiidae

Arctiinae
Carlotta's tiger moth, Apantesis carlotta
Nais tiger moth, Apantesis nais
Harnessed moth, Apantesis phalerata
Garden tiger moth, Arctia caja
Yellow-colored scape moth, Cisseps fulvicollis
Salt marsh moth, Estigmene acrea
Celia's tiger moth, Grammia celia
Figured tiger moth, Grammia figurata
Oithana tiger moth, Grammia oithona
Phyllira tiger moth, Grammia phyllira
Little virgin tiger moth, Grammia virguncula
Banded tussock moth, Halysidota tessellaris
Confused haploa moth, Haploa confusa
Orange holomelina moth, Holomelina aurantiaca
Buchholz's holomelina moth, Holomelina buchholzi
Immaculate holomelina moth, Holomelina immaculata
Bog holomelina moth, Holomelina lamae
Giant leopard moth, Hypercompe scribonia
Ruby tiger moth, Phragmatobia fuliginosa
Large ruby tiger moth, Phragmatobia assimilans
Lined ruby tiger moth, Phragmatobia lineata
Isabella tiger moth, Pyrrharctia isabella
Agreeable tiger moth, Spilosoma congrua
Dubious tiger moth, Spilosoma dubia
Pink-legged tiger moth, Spilosoma latipennis
Virginia tiger moth, Spilosoma virginica

Ctenuchinae
Yellow-colored scape moth, Cisseps fulvicollis
Virginia ctenucha moth, Ctenucha virginica

Lithosiinae
Pale lichen moth, Crambidia pallida
Painted lichen moth, Hypoprepia fucosa
Scarlet lichen moth, Hypoprepia miniata

Crambidae
Celery leaftier moth, Udea rubigalis

Elachistidae
Hemlock moth, Agonopterix alstroemeriana

Erebidae

Catocalinae
Three-staff underwing moth, Catocala amestris
Yellow-banded underwing moth, Catocala cerogama

Geometridae

Ennominae
Peppered moth, Biston betularia
Pale beauty moth, Campaea perlata
Spiny looper moth, Phigalia titea

Larentiinae
White-striped black moth, Trichodezia albovittata

Lasiocampidae

Lasiocampinae
Eastern tent caterpillar moth, Malacosoma americanum
Forest tent caterpillar moth, Malacosoma disstria

Limacodidae
Saddleback caterpillar moth, Acharia stimulea

Lymantriidae
Gypsy moth, Lymantria dispar
White-marked tussock moth, Orgyia leucostigma

Noctuidae

Amphipyrinae
Copper underwing moth, Amphipyra pyramidea

Hadeninae
White-speck moth, Mythimna unipuncta

Herminiinae
Grayish zanclognatha moth, Zanclognatha pedipilalis

Noctuinae
Large yellow underwing, Noctua pronuba

Notodontidae
Sigmoid prominent moth, Clostera albosigma
Apical prominent moth, Clostera apicalis
Linden prominent moth, Ellida caniplaga
White furcula moth, Furcula borealis
Modest furcula moth, Furcula modesta
Western furcula moth, Furcula occidentalis
Lintner's pebble moth, Gluphisia lintneri
Small pebble moth, Gluphisia septentrionis
Saddle prominent moth, Heterocampa guttivitta
Oblique heterocampa moth, Heterocampa obliqua
White-blotched heterocampa moth, Heterocampa umbrata
Zaya heterocampa moth, Heterocampa zayasi
Pink prominent moth, Hyparpax aurora
Georgian prominent moth, Hyperaeschra georgica
Double-lined prominent moth, Lochmaeus bilineata
Variable oakleaf moth, Lochmaeus manteo
Mottled prominent moth, Macrurocampa marthesia
Drab prominent moth, Misogada unicolor
Rough prominent moth, Nadata gibbosa
Double-toothed prominent moth, Nerice bidentata
Base-streaked prominent moth, Notodonta scitipennis
Elegant prominent moth, Odontosia elegans
Chocolate prominent moth, Peridea ferruginea
Angulose prominent moth, Peridea angulosa
Black-rimmed prominent moth, Pheosia rimosa
Chestnut schizura, Schizura badia
Red-humped caterpillar moth, Schizura concinna
Morning-glory prominent moth, Schizura ipomoeae
Black-blotched schizura moth, Schizura leptinoides
Unicorn caterpillar moth, Schizura unicornis

Saturniidae

Citheroniinae
Orangestriped oakworm moth, Anisota senatoria
Spiny oakworm moth, Anisota stigma
Pink-striped oakworm moth, Anisota virginiensis
Regal moth, Citheronia regalis
Rosy maple moth, Dryocampa rubicunda
Imperial moth, Eacles imperialis
Honey locust moth, Sphingicampa bicolor
Bisected honey locust moth, Sphingicampa bisecta

Hemileucinae
Io moth, Automeris io
Buck moth, Hemileuca maia
Nevada buck moth, Hemileuca nevadensis

Saturniinae
Luna moth, Actias luna
Polyphemus moth, Antheraea polyphemus
Giant silkmoth, Callosamia angulifera
Promethea silkmoth, Callosamia promethea
Columbia silkmoth, Hyalophora columbia
Cecropia moth, Hyalophora cecropia

Sphingidae

Macroglossinae
Tantalus sphinx, Aellopos tantalus
Nessus sphinx, Amphion floridensis
Azalea sphinx, Darapsa choerilus
Virginia creeper sphinx, Darapsa myron
Hydrangea sphinx, Darapsa versicolor
Lettered sphinx, Deidamia inscriptum
Mournful sphinx, Enyo lugubris
Ello sphinx, Erinnyis ello
Achemon sphinx, Eumorpha achemon
Pandora sphinx moth, Eumorpha pandorus
Snowberry clearwing, Hemaris diffinis
Slender clearwing, Hemaris gracilis
Hummingbird clearwing, Hemaris thysbe
Bedstraw hawkmoth, Hyles gallii
White-lined sphinx, Hyles lineata
Abbott's sphinx, Sphecodina abbottii
Tersa sphinx, Xylophanes tersa

Sphinginae
Pink-spotted hawkmoth, Agrius cingulata
Five-spotted hawkmoth, Manduca quinquemaculata
Clemens' hawkmoth, Sphinx luscitiosa
Tobacco hornworm, Manduca sexta
Walnut sphinx, Amorpha juglandis
Elm sphinx, Ceratomia amyntor
Catalpa sphinx, Ceratomia catalpae
Waved sphinx, Ceratomia undulosa
Pawpaw sphinx, Dolba hyloeus
Northern pine sphinx, Lapara bombycoides
Cluentius sphinx, Neococytius cluentius
Modest sphinx, Pachysphinx modesta
Blinded sphinx, Paonias excaecatus
Small-eyed sphinx, Paonias myops
One-eyed sphinx, Smerinthus cerisyi
Twin-spotted sphinx, Smerinthus jamaicensis
Canadian sphinx, Sphinx canadensis
Great ash sphinx, Sphinx chersis
Wild cherry sphinx, Sphinx drupiferarum
Hermit sphinx, Sphinx eremitus
Laurel sphinx, Sphinx kalmiae
Poecila sphinx, Sphinx poecila

Yponomeutidae
Ailanthus webworm moth, Atteva aurea

References
 

Butterflies
Michigan